The selection process for the 1976 Winter Olympics consisted of four bids, and saw Denver, Colorado, United States, selected ahead of Sion, Switzerland; Tampere, Finland; and Vancouver, British Columbia, Canada. The selection was made at the 70th International Olympic Committee (IOC) Session in Amsterdam on 12 May 1970. The year 1976 was the centennial for the state of Colorado and bicentennial for the United States.

In early 1972, the venues for the skiing events were changed to established areas west of the continental divide, approved by the IOC in February. Alpine events were moved to Vail from the undeveloped Mount Sniktau (and Loveland Ski Area) east of Loveland Pass, and the Nordic events moved from Evergreen to Steamboat Springs. The original sites submitted in the 1970 bid satisfied a requirement of proximity to the Olympic Village (at the University of Denver).

Later that year on 7 November, Colorado voters rejected in a referendum to partially fund the games, and for the first time a city awarded an Olympics rejected them. Denver officially withdrew on 15 November, and the IOC then offered the Olympics to Whistler, British Columbia, Canada, but they declined, owing to a change of government following elections.  Whistler was later part of neighbouring Vancouver's successful bid for the 2010 Winter Olympics.

Original runner-up Sion also declined. Salt Lake City, Utah, initially offered to host, then pulled its bid, and was replaced by Lake Placid, New York. At a meeting of the IOC executive committee in Lausanne, Switzerland, on 4 February 1973, the 1976 Winter Olympics were transferred from Denver to Innsbruck, which had recently hosted in 1964. The next Winter Olympics were in the United States at Lake Placid (awarded in October 1974), and Salt Lake City hosted in 2002.

Results

References

Bids
 
May 1970 events in Europe
1970s in Amsterdam
1970 in the Netherlands
Sporting events in the Netherlands
1970 in Dutch sport